Chen Yi (born 28 January 1997) is a Chinese field hockey player for the Chinese national team. She played in the 2020 Summer Olympics.

References

External links
 

1997 births
Living people
Sportspeople from Sichuan
Chinese female field hockey players
Female field hockey goalkeepers
Olympic field hockey players of China
Field hockey players at the 2020 Summer Olympics